The Blastolene Special, also known as the "Tank Car", is a unique, specially built car, designed and built by American master craftsman Randy Grubb. The car is currently owned by American entertainer Jay Leno, who regularly drives it on public streets, and also has the car on display at various car shows and meets (such as Cars and Coffee events for example) in the greater Los Angeles area, and the Californian car culture enthusiast scene. Created from an American military tank engine and a custom-made aluminium body, it originally produced 810 bhp (600 kW) at 2,800 rpm and 1,560 ft lb (2,120 N·m) of torque at 2,400 rpm. The car weighs 9,500 pounds (4,300 kg) which is 1/11th the weight of the original tank from which the engine was used.

History
In 2001, the Blastolene Special was built by craftsman Randy Grubb. It is powered by a Continental AV1790-5B, a huge engine that weighs as much as a Volkswagen Beetle, which was previously used in the 51-ton M47 Patton Tank in the 1950s. It also features a Greyhound bus transmission and a retro designed sheet metal body. Jay Leno put it into the extensive collection of cars he owns —84 cars and 73 motorcycles . The car was built at Grubb's shop in Grants Pass, Oregon.

After purchasing the car, Jay Leno made numerous enhancements to the roadworthiness of the vehicle, including a new six-speed Allison automatic gearbox, new rear brakes, new electrical system, and chassis work. The engine was later upgraded with fuel injection and twin turbochargers from Gale Banks and his company, Gale Banks Engineering.

Facts
 Introduced as "The Jay Leno Tank Car" on Gran Turismo 4, it ended up in the game "by accident" when the development team visited Jay's garage to record some engine sounds. They noticed the car and put it in the game on behalf of their intrigue.
 During one of the first freeway test drives an unsuitable oil line ruptured and dumped the entire 17 gallons of oil onto the road
 The car gets 5 miles per gallon (up from the original performance of 2–3 miles per gallon, after the transmission was replaced.)
 The engine red-lines at 2,900 rpm.
 Jay Leno brought the car on his show when interviewing Arnold Schwarzenegger and introduced it as "The Terminator car".
 Jay Leno had a tuning company, Gale Banks Engineering, add twin turbochargers to the engine, not for higher power but to get better fuel economy.
Blastolene has since made a similar car styled after a 1950s-era Indy Car, called the Blastolene Indy Special.

Specifications
 Weight — 4,300 kg (9500 lb)
 Length — 6.40 metres (252 in)
 Transmission — 6-speed Allison automatic
 Quarter Mile — 14.7 seconds @ 
 Top Speed — 140 mph+

See also
 Blastolene Indy Special

References

External links
Blastolene Special at Randy Grubb's official site.
Popular Mechanics article
Car and Driver article
Gale Banks official website
Clubhotrod gallery pictures of the vehicle

One-off cars
Individual cars